Tyler Olson, is a former Iowa State Representative from the 38th District. A member of the Democratic Party, he served in the Iowa House of Representatives from 2007 to 2015.  He also was Chairman of the Iowa Democratic Party from January to June 2013. He received his BA from Claremont McKenna College and his JD from the University of Iowa College of Law.

, Olson serves on several committees in the Iowa House - as a member of the Commerce and Judiciary committees and as the ranking member of the Appropriations Committee. He also serves as a member of the Medical Assistance Projections and Assessment Council and of the Single Point of Entry Long-term Living Resources System Team. His prior political experience includes serving on the Linn County Democratic Central Committee Finance Committee, serving as finance director for Rob Tully for Congress in 1998, and working as assistant finance director for the Democratic Congressional Campaign Committee from 1999 to 2000. Olson announced a run for Governor of Iowa in 2013, but ultimately dropped out of the race.

Electoral history
*incumbent

References

External links

Representative Tyler Olson official Iowa General Assembly site
Tyler Olson State Representative official constituency site
 

1976 births
Claremont McKenna College alumni
Iowa lawyers
Living people
Democratic Party members of the Iowa House of Representatives
People from Linn County, Iowa
University of Iowa College of Law alumni